Çınarköy is a village in the District of Kuşadası, Aydın Province, Turkey. As of 2010, it had a population of 321 people.

References

Villages in Kuşadası District